Drosera silvicola is a species of pygmy sundew from Western Australia. The specific epithet "silvicola" is derived from Latin, meaning "living in the forest" ("silva" = forest), referring to the location of its habitat.

Carnivorous plants of Australia
silvicola
Caryophyllales of Australia